Besso (3667 m) is a mountain in the Pennine Alps in the Swiss canton of Valais.
 
The name Besso means "twins" in the dialect of the Val d'Hérens and refers to the twin summits of the mountain.

The first ascent of the mountain was probably made by the guides J. B. Épinay and J. Vianin in 1862.  The classic route on the mountain – the south-west ridge (PD+) – was, according to Collomb, "possibly" first climbed by R. L. G. Irving and party in 1906.

The Mountet hut (2,886 m) is used for the normal route, which is known as the "Ladies' Route".

References

External links
 Besso on SummitPost

Mountains of the Alps
Alpine three-thousanders
Mountains of Valais
Pennine Alps
Mountains of Switzerland